Davit Skhirtladze (born 16 March 1993) is a Georgian professional footballer who plays as a midfielder for Erovnuli Liga club Dinamo Tbilisi.

Club career
Skhirtladze started training with the Danish side AGF in January 2011. After several months with reserve squad, he was eventually granted professional contract and joined the first-team.

In January 2016, Skhirtladze joined Silkeborg on a free transfer. He left the club after a mutual agreement in September 2018.

On 12 February 2021, Skhirtladze returned to Denmark and joined Danish 1st Division club Viborg FF on a deal for the rest of the season. He left Viborg again at the end of the season.

Career statistics

References

External links
 Official Danish League stats
 AGF's Georgians will play Danish super league

1993 births
Living people
Footballers from Georgia (country)
Association football forwards
Association football wingers
Expatriate footballers from Georgia (country)
Georgia (country) youth international footballers
Georgia (country) under-21 international footballers
Georgia (country) international footballers
Danish Superliga players
Danish 1st Division players
Latvian Higher League players
Slovak Super Liga players
Ekstraklasa players
Aarhus Gymnastikforening players
Silkeborg IF players
FC Spartak Trnava players
Riga FC players
Arka Gdynia players
FC Dinamo Tbilisi players
Viborg FF players
Expatriate men's footballers in Denmark
Expatriate footballers in Latvia
Expatriate footballers in Poland
Expatriate sportspeople from Georgia (country) in Denmark
Expatriate sportspeople from Georgia (country) in Latvia
Expatriate sportspeople from Georgia (country) in Poland
Footballers from Tbilisi
Erovnuli Liga players